The state-sponsored Grand Mariscal of Ayacucho Symphony Orchestra  (Orquesta Sinfónica Gran Mariscal de Ayacucho, or OSGMA) has united a group of young Venezuelan musicians since it was established in 1989. Elisa Vegas has served as the Artistic Director since 2017.

See also 
Venezuelan music

References

External links 
Grand Marshal of Ayacucho Symphony orchestra Discography

Musical groups established in 1989
Venezuelan orchestras
1989 establishments in Venezuela